Events in the year 1859 in Argentina.

Incumbents
President: Justo Jose de Urquiza

Governors
 Buenos Aires Province: Valentín Alsina (until 8 November), Felipe Llavallol (starting 8 November)
 Governor of Cordoba: Mariano Fragueiro
 Mendoza Province: 
 until 25 March: Juan Cornelio Moyano 
 25 March-16 April: Federico Maza 
 16 April-23 August: Pascual Echagüe
 starting 23 August: Laureano Nazar

Events
 October 23 – Battle of Cepeda (1859)

Births

Deaths

 
1850s in Argentina
Years of the 19th century in Argentina